Lambda Groups Association was a first officially registered LGBT movement organization in Poland, that operated from 1990 to 1997.Artur Jeffmański. LAMBDA, polska organizacja lesbijsko-gejowska. In: Filo, Pismo lesbijek i gejów. 1(19) 1990, p. 3, 1990-03-12. Gdańsk: Ryszard Kisiel, Gdańska Grupa Gejowska FILO. It was established by members of three unofficially functioning organizations: FILO Lambda-Gdańsk, WHM Lambda-Warsaw and ETAP Lambda-Wrocław, with notable members being: Sławomir Starosta, Waldemar Zboralski, Ryszard Ziobro, and Ryszard Kisiel. It was the second organization attempting to legalize LGBT movement organizations in Poland, with Warsaw Gay Movement, disestablished in 1987, being the first.

Organization 
The organization had its branches in 15 cities: Bydgoszcz, Bytom, Gdańsk, Kraków, Lublin, Łódź, Olsztyn, Piotrków Trybunalski, Poznań, Szczecin, Toruń, Warsaw, and Wrocław.Andrzej Selerowicz: Leksykon kochających inaczej. Poznań: Wydawnictwo Softpress, 1993, p. 24-27. ISBN 83-900208-6-6.

Citations

Notes

References 

LGBT history in Poland
LGBT organisations in Poland
1990 establishments in Poland
1997 disestablishments in Poland